The Ministry of Culture, Youth and Sports is a ministry of the Government of South Sudan. The incumbent minister is Dr. Albino Bol Dhieu.

List of Ministers of Culture, Youth and Sports

References

Culture, Youth and Sports
South Sudan
South Sudan
South Sudan, Culture, Youth and Sports